The Montfort Realschule in Zell im Wiesental, a town in the Black Forest in Germany, is a school with approximately 800 students. The school contains 5th through 10th grades for kids coming from cities nearby. Courses offered include English, French, and many of the classes expected of a school, such as grammar and History. In 1985, the school was named after the noble Montfort family, who settled in the area in the 18th century where they developed a regional textile industry.

References

External links
School homepage

Schools in Baden-Württemberg
Educational institutions with year of establishment missing